The Oval, currently known for sponsorship reasons as the Kia Oval, is an international cricket ground in Kennington, located in the borough of Lambeth, in south London. The Oval has been the home ground of Surrey County Cricket Club since it was opened in 1845. It was the first ground in England to host international Test cricket in September 1880. The final Test match of the English season is traditionally played there.

In addition to cricket, The Oval has hosted a number of other historically significant sporting events. In 1870, it staged England's first international football match, versus Scotland. It hosted the first FA Cup final in 1872, as well as those between 1874 and 1892. In 1876, it held both the England v. Wales and England v. Scotland rugby international matches and, in 1877, rugby's first varsity match. It also hosted the final of the 2017 ICC Champions Trophy.

History

The Oval is built on part of the former Kennington Common. Cricket matches were played on the common throughout the early 18th century. The earliest recorded match was the London v Dartford match in June 1724. However, as the common was also used regularly for public executions of those convicted at the Surrey Assizes (it was the south London equivalent of Tyburn), cricket matches had moved away to the Artillery Ground by the 1740s. Kennington Common was eventually enclosed in the mid-19th century under a scheme sponsored by the royal family.

In 1844, the site of the Kennington Oval was a cabbage patch and market garden owned by the Duchy of Cornwall. The Duchy was willing to lease the land for the purpose of a cricket ground, and on 10 March 1845 the first lease, which the club later assumed, was issued to Mr. William Houghton (then president of the progenitor Montpelier Cricket Club) by the Otter Trustees who held the land from the Duchy "to convert it into a subscription cricket ground", for 31 years at a rent of £120 per annum plus taxes amounting to £20. The original contract for turfing The Oval cost £300; the 10,000 grass turfs came from Tooting Common and were laid in the spring of 1845 allowing for the first cricket match to be played in May 1845. Hence, Surrey County Cricket Club (SCCC) was established in 1845.

The popularity of the ground was immediate and the strength of the SCCC grew. On 3 May 1875 the club acquired the remainder of the leasehold for a further term of 31 years from the Otter Trustees for the sum of £2,800.

In 1868, 20,000 spectators gathered at The Oval for the first game of the 1868 Aboriginal cricket tour of England, the first tour of England by any foreign side. Thanks to C.W. Alcock, the Secretary of Surrey from 1872 to 1907, the first Test match in England was played at The Oval in 1880 between England and Australia. The Oval, thereby, became the second ground to stage a Test, after Melbourne Cricket Ground (MCG). In 1882, Australia won the Test by seven runs within two days. The Sporting Times printed a mocking obituary notice for English cricket, which led to the creation of the Ashes trophy, which is still contested whenever England plays Australia. The first Test double century was scored at The Oval in 1884 by Australia's Billy Murdoch.

Surrey's ground is noted as having the first artificial lighting at a sports arena, in the form of gas-lamps, dating to 1889. The current pavilion was completed in time for the 1898 season.

In 1907, South Africa became the second visiting Test team to play a Test match at the ground. In 1928, the West Indies played its first Test match at The Oval, followed by New Zealand in 1931. In 1936, India became the fifth foreign visiting Test side to play at The Oval, followed by Pakistan in 1954 and Sri Lanka in 1998.  Zimbabwe, Bangladesh, Afghanistan and Ireland have yet to play a Test match at The Oval.

The Oval is referenced by the poet Philip Larkin in his poem about the First World War, "MCMXIV". During World War II, The Oval was requisitioned, initially housing anti-aircraft searchlights. It was then turned into a prisoner-of-war camp, intended to hold enemy parachutists. However, as they never came, The Oval was never actually used for this purpose.

The first One Day International match at this venue was played on 7 September 1973 between England and West Indies.  It hosted matches of the 1975, 1979, 1983, and 1999 World Cups. It also hosted five of the fifteen matches in the 2004 ICC Champions Trophy, including the final. The Oval once held the record for the largest playing area of any Test venue in the world. That record has since been surpassed by Gaddafi Stadium in Pakistan, although The Oval remains the largest in Great Britain.

Billionaire Paul Getty, who had a great affinity for cricket and was at one time SCCC President, built a replica of The Oval on his Wormsley Park estate.

The famous gasholders just outside the ground were built around 1853. With the gasholders long disused, there was much speculation as to whether they should be demolished; however, many believe they are an integral part of The Oval's urban landscape and, therefore, their future looks secure. In 2016 the main gasholder was given official protected status as a historically important industrial structure.

On 20 August 2006, The Oval saw the first time a team forfeited a Test match. Pakistan were upset after umpires Darrell Hair and Billy Doctrove docked them five runs and changed the ball after ruling that the team had tampered with it on the fourth day of the final Test against England. Pakistan debated the matter during the tea break and then refused to come out for the final session in protest. By the time they relented and decided to resume, the umpires had already called time on the match and awarded the game to England by default.

The Oval hosted its hundredth Test, against South Africa, on 27 July 2017, becoming the fourth Test venue in the world after Lord's, MCG and SCG to do so. Moeen Ali also became the first player to ever take a Test hat-trick at The Oval, bowling out South Africa in the second innings to win the match.

In Tests, the highest team score at The Oval is 903/7 declared by England against Australia on 20 August 1938. The leading run scorers are Len Hutton (1,521 runs), Alastair Cook (1,217 runs) and Graham Gooch (1,097 runs). The leading wicket takers are Ian Botham (52 wickets), Derek Underwood (45 wickets) and James Anderson (44 wickets).

In ODIs, the highest team score at The Oval is 398/5 by New Zealand against England on 12 June 2015. The leading ODI run scorers are Eoin Morgan (630 runs), Marcus Trescothick (528 runs) and Joe Root (480 runs). The leading ODI wicket takers are James Anderson (30 wickets) and Darren Gough (13 wickets).

In 2021, the Oval Invincibles were formed as a team in the newly-launched The Hundred competition. The initial games in both the men's and women's  competition were played on the ground.

End names
The north-western end of The Oval is traditionally known as the Vauxhall End, as it is nearer to the district of Vauxhall and its railway station. The opposite end (south-east) is known as the Pavilion End as it is the location of the Members' Pavilion.

21st-century redevelopment

At the end of the 2002 cricket season, Surrey started redeveloping the Vauxhall End. The development included demolishing the outdated Surridge, Fender, Jardine, and Peter May north stands, and creating in their place a single four-tier grandstand, currently known as the OCS stand, as it is sponsored by Outsourced Client Solutions International Facilities Management Services. This work was completed in May 2005 and increased ground capacity to around 23,000.

In January 2007, Surrey CCC, announced plans to increase capacity by a further 2,000 seats, this time by redeveloping the Pavilion End. The Lock, Laker, and Peter May south stands were to be replaced by a new stand, which would have a hotel backing on to it. The Surrey Tavern at the entrance to the ground would be demolished, and a new pedestrian plaza would be created in its place, improving access to the ground and opening up views of the historic pavilion. These plans were delayed by objections raised by the Health & Safety Executive as the ground is close to a gasometer. Planning permission was eventually granted, but not before the credit crunch struck, as a result of which this development did not proceed.

In 2009, four masts of semi-permanent telescopic floodlights costing £3.7m were installed for use in late-day through evening matches. The floodlights were especially designed to comply with strict residential planning regulations to lessen their visual impact and any light overspill to residents, as well as to improve the game experience within the ground by reducing excess glare that can affect players, umpires, broadcasters and spectators. Precision reflector systems were fitted for tight beam control to decrease overspill and direct light only where needed. At the end of each season, all four masts can be removed and stored away.

After the 2013 season, a new project was started to add 'wings' to either side of the OCS Stand at the Vauxhall End of the ground. The development was finished in time for the start of the 2014 season. Each 'wing' added 500 seats, increasing the capacity from 23,500 to 24,500.

In September 2015, the Peter May and Tony Lock stands were demolished, to be replaced by a single new and much larger stand named after Peter May. May led Surrey to their sixth and seventh consecutive County Championships in 1957 and 1958 and also captained England from 1955 to 1961, winning the Ashes in 1956. Construction of the new stand, which cost around £10m, began in September 2015. It officially opened on 15 May 2016, increasing the capacity of the ground by 1,300 seats to 25,300.

Following the demolition of the Tony Lock stand, the club renamed the Laker Stand as the Lock/Laker Stand, continuing to honour the contribution made by the spin partnership of Tony Lock and Jim Laker, who collectively took 3,108 wickets for the club.

The Lock/Laker stand was itself demolished in September 2019, and work began on the construction of a new development in its place, initially named "One Oval Square". The new structure will include a three-tier stand that will increase the ground's total capacity to almost 28,000, as well as providing state-of-the-art facilities for the Club’s hospitality, conference and events businesses, and provide improved facilities for Members. The new stand is due to be completed in mid 2021. The project is part of a planned £50m long-term redevelopment of the ground by Surrey County Cricket Club which will see The Oval transformed into the largest cricket stadium in the western hemisphere, with a capacity of 40,000.

Floodlights were added in the shape of an O for oval on one side of the ground to emulate the e-shaped floodlights at Edgbaston.

Other sports

Football
The Oval was also an important site in the historical development of football in England. Football had been played in this part of London for many years prior to the inauguration of The Oval: "The Gymnastic Society", arguably the world's first organised football club, met regularly at nearby Kennington Common during the second half of the eighteenth century to play the game.

Between 1950 and 1963, amateur club Corinthian Casuals played their home matches at The Oval, with the pitch at the Vauxhall End.

First international football match

The Oval was the venue for the first representative football match in the world on 5 March 1870, England against Scotland, organised by The Football Association. The game resulted in a 1–1 draw, but is not recognised by FIFA as the first official international match because the Scotland team was selected only from London-based Scottish players. Similar representative international matches between England and Scotland took place at The Oval until February 1872.

On 8 March 1873, the England national team beat Scotland 4–2 in the first officially recognised international match to be played in England. England continued to play occasionally at The Oval until 1889.

First FA Cup final

The Oval was the site of the first FA Cup final, and also both semi-final matches. On 16 March 1872, The Wanderers beat the Royal Engineers 1–0 to win the first FA Cup.  This final was notable for the Engineers' then innovative footballing style of teamwork rather than individual play.  C. W. Alcock, Secretary of The Football Association, was the prime mover in the creation of the competition. He had also just become Secretary of Surrey CCC, so The Oval was the natural choice of venue for the final. Alcock was also captain of the successful Wanderers side. Apart from 1873, The Oval hosted all subsequent FA Cup finals until 1892.

Rugby
Between 1872 and 1879, The Oval held seven full cap international rugby union matches. The final of the United Hospitals Challenge Cup, the oldest rugby union cup competition in the world, was also first held at The Oval on Wednesday 3 March 1875.

Hockey
From 1935 to 1949 England women's international hockey matches were played at The Oval. One of these matches, in 1938, was the first match in any team sport to be televised by the BBC, as a trial for broadcasting the Oval Test later that year.

Baseball
On March 12, 1889, the Oval hosted an exhibition baseball game between the Chicago Whitestockings and an "All-American" team as part of Albert Spalding's 1888-1889 baseball world tour. The Oval was reported to have been full, and the match was attended by the Prince of Wales who greeted the players following the game.

Conferences and events

As well as being an international sporting venue, The Oval has a conference and events business. The Corinthian Roof Terrace built on the OCS Stand in 2013 features panoramic views of the London skyline.

Other events
The ground has also hosted other sporting events and also music concerts.

On September 18, 1971, a day-long rock concert was held at The Oval to raise funds for famine relief in war-torn Bangladesh. Featuring The Faces and headlined by The Who, a crowd of over 40,000 people attended, with the stage sited at the Vauxhall End. The following year, two more successful concerts were held; the first featuring Frank Zappa and Hawkwind, the second featuring Emerson, Lake and Palmer and Genesis.

The Oval has hosted exhibition matches for Australian rules football. In 1987, the Oval hosted what became known as the Battle of Britain between Carlton and North Melbourne, which included numerous fights and future multiple AFL Premiership coach Alastair Clarkson, at the time only a teenager, breaking Ian Aitken's jaw. In 2005, a record crowd for Australian rules football in England (18,884) saw Fremantle defeat the West Coast Eagles in the Western Derby (thus far, the only edition of the fixture to not be played in Perth). In 2012, approximately 10,000 attended a post-season exhibition match between Port Adelaide and the Western Bulldogs, which Port Adelaide won by 1 point.

In 2011, ahead of an NFL International Series game at Wembley Stadium, the Chicago Bears used The Oval as a practice facility.

Oval gasometer and gasworks

A tall Victorian gasometer, sited less than 50 metres beyond the north-eastern stadium wall, has been a dominating feature of the view from the ground since the mid 1800s. A movement to preserve iconic gasometers across the UK as important and historic monuments of Britain's industrial heritage has emerged in recent years, with the one visible from The Oval often cited as a particularly notable example. The skeletal but decorative wrought iron structure is a landmark in the area and has become an intrinsic part of The Oval's history and urban allure. The cricket commentator Henry Blofeld once said in a broadcast, "As the bowler runs in, it's so quiet you can hear the creak of the gasometer."

Although long unused as a gas holder, the aging structure was only officially decommissioned in 2014, with plans to demolish it being announced in 2013. Blofeld stated: "In comparison, pulling down the Victoria Memorial in front of Buckingham Palace would be child's play.". After local public protest at the proposed demolition, in March 2016 the structure was given Grade II listed status to protect its future.

Transport connections

See also

List of international cricket centuries at the Oval
Archbishop Tenison's School – a historic school located next to the ground, often used as a vantage point for TV cameras and crews
Gasworks Gallery, next to the ground
History of Test cricket from 1877 to 1883
History of Test cricket from 1884 to 1889
History of Test cricket from 1890 to 1900
List of cricket grounds in England and Wales
List of Test cricket grounds

References

External links

 
 Cricinfo page on The Oval
 Aerial view of The Oval at Google Maps
 Annotated aerial photograph
 Images of The Oval

 
Cricket grounds in London
Cricket in London
Defunct football venues in England
FA Cup Final venues
Kennington
Sport in the London Borough of Lambeth
Sports venues completed in 1845
History of the London Borough of Lambeth
Surrey County Cricket Club grounds
Test cricket grounds in England
Corinthian-Casuals F.C.
Defunct rugby union venues in England
Australian rules football grounds
World War II prisoner of war camps in England
1845 establishments in England
1999 Cricket World Cup stadiums
1975 Cricket World Cup stadiums
1979 Cricket World Cup stadiums
1983 Cricket World Cup stadiums
2019 Cricket World Cup stadiums